Kentucky Route 907 (KY 907) is a  state highway in the U.S. State of Kentucky. Its southern terminus is at U.S. Route 31W (US 31W) in Louisville and its northern terminus is at KY 1020 in Louisville.

Major junctions

References

0907
0907
Transportation in Louisville, Kentucky